Westgrove is a rural locality in the Maranoa Region, Queensland, Australia.

History 
The locality takes its name from an early pastoral run in the district which appears on the 1870s Gregory's Map of Queensland.

Yellowbank Junction State School opened on 29 January 1991 and closed on 14 December 2001. It was probably associated with the development of the Yellowbank Gas Plant.

References 

Maranoa Region
Localities in Queensland